Rodrigo Casagrande (born February 15, 1979 in Montevideo, Uruguay) is a former Uruguayan footballer who has played as midfielder for clubs of Uruguay and Paraguay.

Teams
  Huracán Buceo 1998-2000
  Cerro Porteño 2000
  Colón FC 2001
  Nacional 2002-2003
  Montevideo Wanderers 2003-2004
  Fénix 2004-2006

External links
 Profile at BDFA 
 Profile at Tenfield Digital 

1979 births
Living people
Uruguayan footballers
Uruguayan expatriate footballers
Footballers from Montevideo
Huracán Buceo players
Centro Atlético Fénix players
Montevideo Wanderers F.C. players
Club Nacional de Football players
Cerro Porteño players
Expatriate footballers in Paraguay
Uruguayan expatriate sportspeople in Paraguay
Association football midfielders